The Beijing International Challenger was a tennis tournament held in Beijing, China, from 2010 to 2013. The event was part of the ATP Challenger Tour and the ITF Women's Circuit and was played on outdoor hard courts. It was also part of the China Open Series.

The tournament was cancelled at the end of 2013. However, it is relocated, and upgraded to a WTA 125K series tournament which was first held in Nanchang, China, in 2014. The new tournament is named as: Jiangxi International Women's Tennis Open.

Past finals

Men's singles

Women's singles

Men's doubles

Women's doubles

References

External links 
 Official website
 ITF Men's search
 ITF Women's search

 
ATP Challenger Tour
ITF Women's World Tennis Tour
Tennis tournaments in China
Hard court tennis tournaments
Recurring sporting events established in 2010
Recurring sporting events disestablished in 2013
Defunct tennis tournaments in China
Defunct sports competitions in China